Truman McGill Hobbs Sr. (February 8, 1921 – November 4, 2015) was a United States district judge of the United States District Court for the Middle District of Alabama.

Education and career

Born in Selma, Alabama, Hobbs received an Artium Baccalaureus degree from the University of North Carolina in 1942, and was a Lieutenant in the United States Navy during World War II, from 1942 to 1946. He received a Bachelor of Laws from Yale Law School in 1948, becoming a law clerk to Justice Hugo Black of the Supreme Court of the United States from 1948 to 1949. He was in private practice in Montgomery, Alabama, from 1949 to 1980, also serving as chairman of the Alabama Unemployment Appeal Board from 1952 to 1958.

Federal judicial service

On January 23, 1980, Hobbs was nominated by President Jimmy Carter to a new seat on the United States District Court for the Middle District of Alabama created by 92 Stat. 1629. He was confirmed by the United States Senate on April 3, 1980, and received his commission the same day. He served as Chief Judge from 1984 to 1991, assuming senior status on February 11, 1991. He died on November 4, 2015, at his family home in Montgomery.

See also 
List of law clerks of the Supreme Court of the United States (Seat 1)

References

Sources
 

1921 births
2015 deaths
People from Selma, Alabama
Judges of the United States District Court for the Middle District of Alabama
Law clerks of the Supreme Court of the United States
United States district court judges appointed by Jimmy Carter
20th-century American judges
University of North Carolina at Chapel Hill alumni
Yale Law School alumni
United States Navy officers
Alabama lawyers
United States Navy personnel of World War II